Connecticut Route 12 is a state highway that runs between Groton and the state line in Thompson.

History
Route 12 was preceded by New England Interstate Route 12. The southern terminus of NE-12 was originally at New London, Connecticut. It travelled along present-day Route 32 (along the west bank of the Thames River) from New London to Norwich, Connecticut. In 1932, when Connecticut decommissioned its New England Routes, Route 12 swapped places with Route 32 south of Norwich. From Norwich to the Massachusetts border, Route 12 still follows its 1920s alignment.

Route description
Route 12 from Groton to Norwich is a primary route, serving the Naval Submarine Base New London and is known as the U.S. Submarine Veterans Memorial Highway. North of Norwich, Route 12 is a minor road closely paralleling Interstate 395. Route 12 goes through the following towns: Groton, Ledyard, Preston, Norwich, Lisbon, Griswold, Canterbury (0.14 miles only), Plainfield, Killingly, Putnam, and Thompson.

Junction list

References

External links

Route 12 at Connecticut Roads

012
Transportation in New London County, Connecticut
Transportation in Windham County, Connecticut